Standard Chartered Ghana (officially Standard Chartered Bank Ghana Limited) is a banking and financial services company in Ghana, and an 80% subsidiary of Standard Chartered. They are listed on the stock index of the Ghana Stock Exchange, the GSE All-Share Index. Operating since 1896, it is one of the oldest companies in Ghana. It is the successor to the Bank of British West Africa in Ghana.

Management  
Mansa Nettey - Chief Executive Officer

External links
Standard Chartered Bank Ghana Official Website

Banks of Ghana
Companies based in Accra
Companies listed on the Ghana Stock Exchange
Banks established in 1896
Standard Chartered